The 2011 Challenge Bell was a tennis tournament played on indoor carpet courts. It was the 19th edition of the Challenge Bell, and was part of the WTA International tournaments of the 2011 WTA Tour. It took place at the PEPS de l'Université Laval in Quebec City, Canada, from September 10 through September 17, 2011.

Entrants

Seeds

1 Rankings are as of August 29, 2011

Other entrants
The following players received wildcards into the singles main draw:
 Eugenie Bouchard
 Marie-Ève Pelletier
 Aleksandra Wozniak

The following players received entry from the qualifying draw:
 Elena Bovina
 Gail Brodsky
 Julie Coin
 Ashley Weinhold

Champions

Singles

 Barbora Záhlavová-Strýcová def.  Marina Erakovic, 4–6, 6–1, 6–0

Doubles

 Raquel Kops-Jones /  Abigail Spears def.  Jamie Hampton /  Anna Tatishvili, 6–1, 3–6, [10–6]

External links
Official website

Challenge Bell
Tournoi de Québec
Challenge Bell
Challenge Bell
Challenge Bell
2010s in Quebec City